Acanthochondria is a genus of copepods, containing the following species:

Acanthochondria alatalongicollis Heegaard, 1940
Acanthochondria alleni Tang, Kalman & Ho, 2010
Acanthochondria bicornis Shiino, 1955
Acanthochondria brevicorpa Yü, 1935
Acanthochondria clavata (Bassett-Smith, 1896)
Acanthochondria constricta Shiino, 1955
Acanthochondria cornuta (O. F. Müller, 1776)
Acanthochondria cyclopsetta Pearse, 1952
Acanthochondria dilatata Shiino, 1955
Acanthochondria dojirii Kabata, 1984
Acanthochondria elongata (Bassett-Smith, 1898)
Acanthochondria epachthes (C. B. Wilson, 1908)
Acanthochondria eptatreti (Chen, Luo, Dai & Shih, 2014)
Acanthochondria exilipes C. B. Wilson, 1932
Acanthochondria fissicauda Shiino, 1955
Acanthochondria fraseri Ho, 1972
Acanthochondria galerita (Rathbun, 1886)
Acanthochondria glandiceps Shiino, 1955
Acanthochondria helicoleni Cantatore & Timi, 2010
Acanthochondria hippoglossi Kabata, 1987
Acanthochondria hoi Kalman, 2003
Acanthochondria incisa Shiino, 1955
Acanthochondria inimici Yamaguti, 1939
Acanthochondria kajika Ho & I. H. Kim, 1996
Acanthochondria laemonemae Capart, 1959
Acanthochondria lepidionis Barnard, 1955
Acanthochondria lilianae Cantatore, Lanfranchi & Timi, 2011
Acanthochondria limandae (Krøyer, 1863)
Acanthochondria longifrons Shiino, 1955
Acanthochondria macrocephala Gusev, 1951
Acanthochondria margolisi Kabata, 1984
Acanthochondria ophidii (Krøyer, 1863)
Acanthochondria oralis Yamaguti, 1939
Acanthochondria phycidis (Rathbun, 1886)
Acanthochondria pingi (Yü & Wu, 1932)
Acanthochondria platycephali Heegaard, 1940
Acanthochondria priacanthi Shiino, 1964
Acanthochondria rectangularis (Fraser, 1920)
Acanthochondria sagitta Alarcos & Timi, 2011
Acanthochondria shawi Yü, 1935
Acanthochondria sicyasis (Krøyer, 1863)
Acanthochondria sixteni (C. B. Wilson, 1922)
Acanthochondria soleae (Krøyer, 1838)
Acanthochondria spirigera Shiino, 1955
Acanthochondria tasmaniae Heegaard, 1962
Acanthochondria tchangi Yü, 1935
Acanthochondria triangularis Alves, Luque & Paraguassu, 2003
Acanthochondria triglae Herrera-Cubilla & Raibaut, 1990
Acanthochondria uranoscopi Ho & I. H. Kim, 1995
Acanthochondria vancouverensis Kabata, 1984
Acanthochondria yui Shiino, 1964

Several species inquirendae are also assigned to the genus:
Acanthochondria argutula (Markevich, 1940)
Acanthochondria ateleopi Capart, 1959
Acanthochondria barnardi Capart, 1959
Acanthochondria briani (Yü & Wu, 1932)
Acanthochondria compacta Markevich, 1956
Acanthochondria grandigenitalis (Yü & Wu, 1932)
Acanthochondria spinulosa Capart, 1959
Acanthochondria wui Yü, 1935

References 

Poecilostomatoida
Parasitic crustaceans